Leonard Leslie "King" Cole (April 15, 1886 – January 6, 1916) was an American professional baseball player in the early 20th century. He started his baseball career as a pitcher with the Chicago Cubs of Major League Baseball (MLB) in 1909.

With the 1910 Cubs, Cole had a record of 20–4 and helped the team win the National League pennant. On July 31 of that season, he pitched all seven innings in a 4–0 Cubs win over the St. Louis Cardinals, without giving up a hit. It was the second game of a doubleheader: the teams had agreed to end the game at 5 p.m. so they could catch their trains. Due to a 1991 change to the official MLB definition of a no-hitter—it must last at least nine innings—Cole's effort is not recognized by as a no-hitter by MLB.

Cole's 20–4 record in 1910 was the third-best single-season winning percentage (.833) for a Cubs pitcher in the 20th century. Cole was traded to the Pittsburgh Pirates in May 1912, did not play in the major leagues in 1913, then played for the New York Yankees in 1914 and 1915. On October 2, 1914, Cole gave up a double to Babe Ruth, then a pitcher for the Boston Red Sox, for Ruth's first hit in the major leagues.

In 1915, Cole was diagnosed with lung cancer; he died in January 1916.

Ring Lardner wrote about Cole in articles for The Sporting News.  Lardner compiled the stories into the Alibi Ike stories.

See also

List of baseball players who died during their careers
List of Major League Baseball annual ERA leaders

References

External links

1886 births
1916 deaths
Chicago Cubs players
Pittsburgh Pirates players
New York Yankees players
Major League Baseball pitchers
Baseball players from Iowa
National League ERA champions
Bay City (minor league baseball) players
Columbus Senators players
Deaths from lung cancer
People from Toledo, Iowa
Deaths from cancer in Michigan